Harold Wilson of the Labour Party would form his Second Shadow Cabinet, as Leader of Her Majesty’s Most Loyal Opposition, after losing the 1970 general election to Conservative Edward Heath. He would retain leadership of the Opposition for the length of the Heath Ministry, from 1970 − 1974. In February 1974, his party would narrowly win an election. Wilson was then forced to form a minority government, which would only last until another election in October of that year. After that election, Wilson would form a majority government.

Shadow Cabinet list

June 1970

Changes

1971
 James Callaghan replaces Barbara Castle as Shadow Secretary of State for Employment
 Barbara Castle replaces Shirley Williams as Shadow Secretary of State for Health and Social Services
 Shirley Williams replaces James Callaghan as Shadow Secretary of State for the Home Department
 Michael Foot replaces Fred Peart as Shadow Leader of the House of Commons
 Fred Peart replaces Cledwyn Hughes as Shadow Minister for Agriculture, Fisheries and Food
 Peter Shore joins the shadow cabinet as Shadow Minister for Europe

1972
 Reg Prentice joins the shadow cabinet, replacing James Callaghan as Shadow Employment Secretary
 James Callaghan replaces Denis Healey as Shadow Foreign Secretary
 Denis Healey replaces Roy Jenkins as Shadow Chancellor
 Fred Peart replaces George Thomson as Shadow Defence Secretary
 Edward Short replaces Roy Jenkins as Deputy Leader of the Opposition and takes Fred Peart’s former post, Shadow Leader of the House of Commons
 Roy Jenkins is removed from the shadow cabinet
 Michael Foot replaces Peter Shore as Shadow Europe Minister
 Harold Lever replaces Tony Benn as Shadow Trade and Industry Secretary
 Merlyn Rees joins the shadow cabinet with a newly created post: Shadow Secretary of State for Northern Ireland
 Barbara Castle is removed from the shadow cabinet

1973
 Roy Jenkins returns to the shadow cabinet, replacing Shirley Williams as Shadow Home Secretary
 Shirley Williams takes the newly created post of Shadow Secretary of State for Prices and Consumer Protection

See also
 List of British shadow cabinets
 List of shadow holders of Great Offices of State
 Cabinet of the United Kingdom
 First Wilson Ministry
 Second Wilson Ministry

References
 

British shadow cabinets
Harold Wilson
Wilson
Official Opposition (United Kingdom)
1970 establishments in the United Kingdom
1974 disestablishments in the United Kingdom
1970 in British politics